Significance, established in 2004, is a bimonthly magazine published by Oxford University Press on behalf of the Royal Statistical Society (RSS), the Statistical Society of Australia (SSA) and the American Statistical Association (ASA). It publishes articles on topics of statistical interest presented at a level suited for a general audience. Articles are reviewed by an editorial board of statistics experts drawn from the three societies. The founding editor-in-chief was Helen Joyce. The current editor is Anna Britten. Significance replaced the RSS's journal, The Statistician.

In addition to ordinary articles in the magazine, additional "virtual issues" (collections of articles on a particular subject area) are made available online. In November 2010 the magazine launched its website. Having been launched as a quarterly magazine, Significance changed to a bimonthly frequency in 2011. In 2020, the regular column 'Dr Fisher's Casebook' was renamed 'the secret statistician', a review prompted by concern about Fisher's views on eugenics (and supported by the lack of salience of the homage to Dr Finlay's Casebook).

Members of either the RSS or the ASA receive the magazine as part of their membership. In January 2015, the RSS and ASA decided to make the magazine issues available to the public free of charge a year after their publication.

References

External links
 
 Magazine page at publisher's website

2004 establishments in the United Kingdom
American Statistical Association
Bi-monthly magazines published in the United Kingdom
Science and technology magazines published in the United Kingdom
English-language magazines
Magazines established in 2004
Royal Statistical Society